Barn House is the site of a summer artists' colony in Chilmark, Massachusetts, on the island of Martha's Vineyard.  The property includes one of the oldest houses in Chilmark, a barn dating from the 1780s, and facilities constructed primarily during the 1920s by the Chilmark Associates to facilitate its use as a summer retreat.  The property represents aspects of the island's development from its agrarian origins to a summer vacation destination.

History
English settlement of the island of Martha's Vineyard began in 1641.  One early settler in what is now Chilmark, Massachusetts was Nathan Skiffe, who established a  sheep farm in 1686.  The raising of sheep continued to be a major business in Chilmark into the 19th century, and his property continued to be used for that purpose by descendants and extended family members into the early 20th century.  Skiffe built a house on the property in about 1690.  Evidence indicates that some of the timbers used in its construction may have been recycled from other structures, likely hauled from elsewhere on the island.  In addition to the house, the only major structure to survive into the 20th century is a barn, dated to the 1780s.

In 1919 Gertrude King acquired , including the house and barn, on behalf of a group friends who eventually organized as the Chilmark Associates.  This group of well-to-do liberal artists, writers, and activists sought to adapt the property for use as a communal summer retreat.  To this end they adapted the barn for use as a dining and meeting center for their community, and constructed a series of cabins in which to live.  In 1927 they formally named the property "Barn House".  The membership of the Chilmark Associates fluctuated over time. Notable members and guests included journalist Walter Lippman, jurist Felix Frankfurter, judge and political activist Dorothy Kenyon, painter Thomas Hart Benton, and poet Sylvia Plath.

District elements
Barn House was listed on the National Register of Historic Places in 2011.  The district's contributing elements include the following buildings:
 Barn House, c. 1690
 Barn, c. 1786
 A shed, c. 1850
 Seven cabins, constructed between 1920 and 1959
The following resources also contribute:
 The property's stone walls, which appear to date to the 18th century
 A stone-slab culvert over a stream, dating to the 19th century
Non-contributing resources in the district include a tennis court and bath house, as well as a c. 2001 cabin.

See also
 National Register of Historic Places listings in Dukes County, Massachusetts

References

Historic districts on the National Register of Historic Places in Massachusetts
National Register of Historic Places in Dukes County, Massachusetts
Tourist attractions in Chilmark, Massachusetts